"Go Too Far" is a song by American rapper Jibbs featuring former The Pussycat Dolls member Melody Thornton. It is released on January 13, 2007, as the third single from Jibbs' debut studio album Jibbs Featuring Jibbs. The song samples Janet Jackson's "Let's Wait Awhile". The song was written by Jackson, Melanie Andrews, and Terry Lewis.

Critical reception
"Go Too Far" received generally positive reception from music critics. David Jeffries of Allmusic described it as "sugary sweet", and the song is considered one of the a highlights of the album. Chuck Campbell of Scripps Howard News Service called the song "wimpy".

Music video
The music video was directed by Meiert Avis and shows Jibbs and Melody Thornton having a day out in Venice Beach. Former Girlicious member Tiffanie Anderson makes an appearance in the video.

Charts

References

2007 singles
Jibbs songs
Geffen Records singles
Songs written by Jimmy Jam and Terry Lewis
Songs written by Janet Jackson
Music videos directed by Meiert Avis
2007 songs